Unicameralism (from uni- "one" + Latin camera "chamber") is a type of legislature, which consists of one house or assembly, that legislates and votes as one. Unicameralism has become an increasingly common type of legislature, making up nearly 60% of all national legislatures and an even greater share of subnational legislatures.

Sometimes, as in New Zealand and Denmark, unicameralism comes about through the abolition of one of two bicameral chambers, or, as in Sweden, through the merger of the two chambers into a single one, while in others a second chamber has never existed from the beginning.

Rationale for unicameralism and criticism
The principal advantage of a unicameral system is more efficient lawmaking, as the legislative process is simpler and there is no possibility of deadlock between two chambers. Proponents of unicameralism have also argued that it reduces costs, even if the number of legislators stays the same, since there are fewer institutions to maintain and support financially. More popular among modern-day democratic countries, unicameral, proportional legislatures are widely seen as both more democratic and effective.

Proponents of bicameral legislatures say that having two legislative chambers offers an additional restraint on the majority, though critics note that there are other ways to restrain majorities, such as through non-partisan courts and a robust constitution.

List of unicameral legislatures

Approximately half of the world's sovereign states are currently unicameral. The People's Republic of China is somewhat in-between, with a legislature and a formal advisory body. China has a Chinese People's Political Consultative Conference which meets alongside the National People's Congress, in many respects an advisory "upper house".

Many subnational entities have unicameral legislatures. These include the state of Nebraska and territories of Guam and the Virgin Islands in the United States, the Chinese special administrative regions of Hong Kong and Macao, the Australian state of Queensland as well as the Northern Territory and the Australian Capital Territory, a majority of the provinces of Argentina, all of the provinces and territories in Canada, all of the regions of Italy, all of the Spanish autonomous communities, both the autonomous regions of Portugal, most of the states and union territories of India, and all of the states of Brazil and Germany. In the United Kingdom, the devolved Scottish Parliament, the Senedd Cymru, the Northern Ireland Assembly, and the London Assembly are also unicameral.

National (UN member states and observers)

Federal
 Assembly of the Union of the Comoros
 Bundestag of Germany
 Council of Representatives of Iraq (provision exists for the founding of a "Council of Union", but no move to this effect has been initiated by the existing Council)
 Congress of the Federated States of Micronesia
 National Assembly of Saint Kitts and Nevis
 Federal National Council of the United Arab Emirates
 National Assembly of Venezuela

Unitary

Africa
 National Assembly of Angola
 National Assembly of Benin
 National Assembly of Botswana
 National Assembly of Burkina Faso
 National Assembly of Cape Verde
 National Assembly of the Central African Republic
 National Assembly of Chad
 National Assembly of Djibouti
 National Assembly of Eritrea
 National Assembly of The Gambia
 Parliament of Ghana
 National Assembly of Guinea
 National People's Assembly of Guinea-Bissau
 House of Representatives of Libya
 National Assembly of Malawi
 Majlis of Maldives
 National Assembly of Mali
 Parliament of Mauritania
 National Assembly of Mauritius
 Assembly of the Republic of Mozambique
 National Assembly of Niger
 National Assembly of São Tomé and Príncipe
 National Assembly of Senegal
 National Assembly of Seychelles
 Parliament of Sierra Leone
 National Assembly of Tanzania
 National Assembly of Togo
 National Assembly of Tunisia
 Parliament of Uganda
 National Assembly of Zambia

Asia
 Leadership Council of Afghanistan
 National Assembly of Armenia
 National Assembly of Azerbaijan
 Jatiya Sangsad of Bangladesh
 Legislative Council of Brunei
 National People's Congress of the People's Republic of China – though they also have a Chinese People's Political Consultative Conference which is effectively an advisory "upper house".
 National Parliament of East Timor
 Parliament of Georgia
 Islamic Consultative Assembly of Iran
 Knesset of Israel
 Supreme People's Assembly of the Democratic People's Republic of Korea (North Korea)
 National Assembly of the Republic of Korea (South Korea)
 National Assembly of Kuwait
 Supreme Council of Kyrgyzstan
 National Assembly of Laos
 Parliament of Lebanon
 State Great Khural of Mongolia
 Legislative Council of Palestine
 Consultative Assembly of Qatar
 Consultative Assembly of Saudi Arabia (most powers are reserved for the King)
 Parliament of Singapore
 Parliament of Sri Lanka
 Parliament of Syria
 Grand National Assembly of Turkey
 National Assembly of Vietnam

Europe
 Kuvendi of Albania
 National Assembly of Bulgaria
 Sabor of Croatia
 Folketing of Denmark
 Riigikogu of Estonia
 Parliament of Finland
 Parliament of Greece
 National Assembly of Hungary
 Althing of Iceland
 Saeima of Latvia
 Landtag of Liechtenstein
 Seimas of Lithuania
 Chamber of Deputies of Luxembourg
 Parliament of Malta
 Parliament of Moldova
 National Council of Monaco
 Parliament of Montenegro
 Assembly of North Macedonia
 Storting of Norway
 Assembly of the Republic of Portugal
 Grand and General Council of San Marino
 National Assembly of Serbia
 National Council of Slovakia
 Riksdag of Sweden
 Verkhovna Rada of Ukraine
 Pontifical Commission for Vatican City

North America
 Legislative Assembly of Costa Rica
 National Assembly of People's Power of Cuba
 House of Assembly of Dominica
 Legislative Assembly of El Salvador
 Congress of Guatemala
 National Congress of Honduras
 National Assembly of Nicaragua
 National Assembly of Panama
 House of Assembly of Saint Vincent and the Grenadines

Oceania
 Parliament of the Cook Islands
 Parliament of Fiji
 House of Assembly of Kiribati
 Legislature of the Marshall Islands
 Parliament of Nauru
 Parliament of New Zealand
 Assembly of Niue
 National Parliament of Papua New Guinea
 Legislative Assembly of Samoa
 National Parliament of Solomon Islands
 Legislative Assembly of Tonga
 Parliament of Tuvalu
 Parliament of Vanuatu

South America
 National Assembly of Ecuador
 National Assembly of Guyana
 Congress of the Republic of Peru
 National Assembly of Suriname

Territorial
 House of Assembly of the British Virgin Islands
 Legislative Assembly of the Cayman Islands
 Legislative Assembly of the Falkland Islands
 The Løgting of the Faroe Islands
 Parliament of Gibraltar
 Inatsisartut of Greenland
 Legislature of Guam
 Legislative Council of Hong Kong
 Legislative Assembly of Macao
 House of Assembly of Tobago
 Legislature of the U.S. Virgin Islands

State parliaments with limited recognition
 People's Assembly of Abkhazia
 National Assembly of the Republic of Artsakh
 Assembly of Kosovo
 Assembly of the Republic of Northern Cyprus
 National Council of the Sahrawi Arab Democratic Republic
 Parliament of South Ossetia
 Legislative Yuan of the Republic of China (Taiwan)
 Supreme Council of Transnistria

Subnational

Federations
 All legislatures and legislative councils of the regions and communities of Belgium
 All legislative assemblies in all states of Brazil
 All legislative assemblies of the provinces and territories of Canada
 All Landtage of the states of Germany
 All legislative assemblies of the states of Malaysia
 All legislatures in all states of Mexico
 All legislatures of the provinces in Nepal
 All legislatures of the provinces and territories in Pakistan
 The legislature of the state of Nebraska, and council of the District of Columbia in the United States
 Parliament of Queensland and the legislative assemblies of the territories of Australia (but not the other states)
 Provincial legislatures of the provinces of South Africa
 Narodna skupština of Republika Srpska

 15 of the provinces of Argentina – Chaco, Chubut, Córdoba, Formosa, Jujuy, La Pampa, La Rioja, Misiones, Neuquén, Río Negro, San Juan, Santa Cruz, Santiago del Estero, Tierra del Fuego, Tucumán, and the autonomous city of Buenos Aires.
 22 of the states of India – Arunachal Pradesh, Assam, Chhattisgarh, Goa, Gujarat, Haryana, Himachal Pradesh, Jharkhand, Kerala, Madhya Pradesh, Manipur, Meghalaya, Mizoram, Nagaland, Odisha, Punjab, Rajasthan, Sikkim, Tamil Nadu, Tripura, Uttarakhand, and West Bengal; and 3 of the union territories – Delhi, Jammu and Kashmir, and Puducherry.

Devolved governments
 Iraqi Kurdistan Parliament
 Northern Ireland Assembly
 Scottish Parliament
 Senedd (Welsh Parliament)
 Parliaments of the autonomous communities of Spain
 All regional councils of France
 Bangsamoro Parliament
 All Oblast Councils of Ukraine
 City and County Councils of the special municipalities, provincial cities, and counties of the Republic of China (Taiwan)

Others
 Local People's Congresses of all levels of provinces, regions, and municipalities of the People's Republic of China
 National Council of the Palestine Liberation Organization

List of historical unicameral legislatures

National
 The First Protectorate Parliament and Second Protectorate Parliament of the Kingdom of England, regulated by the Instrument of Government (dissolved)
 Parliament of the Kingdom of Scotland until 1707 (dissolved)
 Congress of the Confederation was unicameral before being replaced in 1789 by the current, bicameral United States Congress.
 Provisional Congress of the Confederate States was unicameral before being replaced by the bicameral Confederate States Congress in 1862.
 Congress of Deputies of Second Spanish Republic was unicameral between 1931 and 1936. Dissolved at the end of Spanish Civil War
 The Parliament of Uzbekistan was unicameral before being replaced in 2005 by the current, bicameral Oliy Majlis.
 National Assembly of Cameroon was unicameral before being replaced in 2013 by the current, bicameral Parliament of Cameroon.
 Chamber of People's Representative of Equatorial Guinea was unicameral before being replaced in 2013 by the current, bicameral Parliament of Equatorial Guinea.
 National Assembly of Kenya was the country's unicameral legislature before becoming the lower house of the bicameral Parliament of Kenya in 2013.
 National Assembly of Ivory Coast was the country's unicameral legislature before becoming the lower house of the bicameral Parliament of Ivory Coast in 2016.
 Central National Committee and the Provisional People's Representative Council of Indonesia was the unicameral legislature of the Republic of Indonesia during the War of Independence and the Liberal democracy era.

Subnational
 General Assembly of Georgia until 1789
 General Assembly of Pennsylvania until 1790
 General Assembly of Vermont until 1836

Other
 Assembly of Representatives of Yishuv community in Mandatory Palestine from 1920 to 1949

Unicameralism in the Philippines
Though the current Congress of the Philippines is bicameral, the country experienced unicameralism in 1898 and 1899 (during the First Philippine Republic), from 1935 to 1941 (the Commonwealth era) and from 1943 to 1944 (during the Japanese occupation). Under the 1973 Constitution, the legislative body was called Batasang Pambansa, which functioned also a unicameral legislature within a parliamentary system (1973-1981) and a semi-presidential system (1981-1986) form of government.

The ongoing process of amending or revising the current Constitution and form of government is popularly known as Charter Change. A shift to a unicameral parliament was included in the proposals of the constitutional commission created by President Gloria Macapagal Arroyo. Unlike in the United States, senators in the Senate of the Philippines are elected not per district and state but nationally; the Philippines is a unitary state. The Philippine government's decision-making process, relative to the United States, is more rigid, highly centralised, much slower and susceptible to political gridlock. As a result, the trend for unicameralism as well as other political system reforms are more contentious in the Philippines.

While Congress is bicameral, all local legislatures are unicameral: the Bangsamoro Parliament, the Sangguniang Panlalawigan (Provincial Boards), Sangguniang Panlungsod (City Councils), Sangguniang Bayan (Municipal Councils), Sangguniang Barangay (Barangay Councils), and the Sangguniang Kabataan (Youth Councils).

Unicameralism in the United States
The Nebraska Legislature (also called the Unicameral) is the supreme legislative body of the state of Nebraska and the only unicameral state legislature in the United States. Its members are called "senators", as it was originally the upper house of a bicameral legislature before the Nebraska House of Representatives dissolved in 1937. The legislature is also notable for being nonpartisan and officially recognizes no party affiliation, making Nebraska unique among U.S. states. With 49 members, it is also the smallest legislature of any U.S. state.

A 2018 study found that efforts to adopt unicameralism in Ohio and Missouri failed due to rural opposition. There was a fear in rural communities that unicameralism would diminish their influence in state government.

Local government legislatures of counties, cities, or other political subdivisions within states are usually unicameral and have limited lawmaking powers compared to their state and federal counterparts.

Some of the 13 colonies which became independent, such as Pennsylvania, New Jersey and New Hampshire had initially introduced strong unicameral legislature and (relatively) less powerful governors with no veto power. Pennsylvania's constitution lasted only 14 years. In 1790, conservatives gained power in the state legislature, called a new constitutional convention, and rewrote the constitution. The new constitution substantially reduced universal male suffrage, gave the governor veto power and patronage appointment authority, and added an upper house with substantial wealth qualifications to the unicameral legislature. Thomas Paine called it a constitution unworthy of America.

In 1999, Governor Jesse Ventura proposed converting the Minnesota Legislature into a single chamber. Although debated, the idea was never adopted.

Seven U.S. states, Arizona, Idaho, Maryland, New Jersey, North Dakota, South Dakota, and Washington, effectively have two-house unicamerals. In these states, districts in the upper house and the lower house are combined into a single constituency, a practice known as nesting.

The U.S. territory of Puerto Rico held a non-binding referendum in 2005. Voters approved changing its Legislative Assembly to a unicameral body by 456,267 votes in favor (83.7%) versus 88,720 against (16.3%). If both the territory's House of Representatives and Senate had approved by a  vote the specific amendments to the Puerto Rico Constitution that are required for the change to a unicameral legislature, another referendum would have been held in the territory to approve such amendments. If those constitutional changes had been approved, Puerto Rico could have switched to a unicameral legislature as early as 2015.

On June 9, 2009, the Maine House of Representatives voted to form a unicameral legislature, but the measure did not pass the Senate.

Because of legislative gridlock in 2009, former Congressman Rick Lazio, a prospective candidate for governor, has proposed that New York adopt unicameralism.

The United States as a whole was subject to a unicameral Congress during the years 1781–1788, when the Articles of Confederation were in effect. The Confederate States of America, pursuant to its Provisional Constitution, in effect from February 8, 1861, to February 22, 1862, was governed by a unicameral Congress.

Notes

References

Legislatures